Gosport Historic District is a national historic district located at Gosport, Owen County, Indiana.  The district encompasses 40 contributing buildings, 1 contributing site, 4 contributing structures, and 4 contributing objects in the central business district and surrounding residential sections of Gosport.  It developed between about 1835 and 1952, and includes notable examples of Italianate, Classical Revival, and Bungalow / American Craftsman style architecture. Located in the district is the separately listed Dr. H.G. Osgood House. Other notable contributing resources include the Bank of Gosport (1867, c. 1900), Gosport Banking Company (1909), Graham Building (1909), Knights of Pythias Building / Opera House (c. 1873), Gosport Town Park (1908, 1942), Gosport Tavern (1835), Gosport Masonic Lodge No. 92 (1923), and the Nazarene Church (1952).

It was listed on the National Register of Historic Places in 2013.

References

Historic districts on the National Register of Historic Places in Indiana
Neoclassical architecture in Indiana
Italianate architecture in Indiana
Bungalow architecture in Indiana
Buildings and structures in Owen County, Indiana
National Register of Historic Places in Owen County, Indiana